Maymana (Persian/Uzbek/Pashto: میمنه) is the capital city of Faryab Province in northwestern Afghanistan, near the Turkmenistan border. The population of Maymana was 149,040 in 2015, making it one of the largest cities of northwestern Afghanistan.

On 14 August 2021, Maymana was seized by Taliban fighters, becoming the twenty-second provincial capital to be captured by the Taliban as part of the wider 2021 Taliban offensive. As of January 2022, however, clashes between Taliban and resistance fighters and protests have been reported in the city.

Location
The Maymana River branches off of the Band-e Turkistan River 50 km south of the city. The highlands of the Maymana region generally possess a very rich topsoil which supports the seasonal agricultural activities.

Land use

Maymana is a trading and transit hub in northern Afghanistan. Just over half of the land in Maymana is non built-up (57%) consisting largely of agriculture. The central districts (2-5) have higher dwelling density and clear road grids. The outer districts(1, 7-10) are characterized by more agricultural land.

Population

During the 19th century, the population of the settlement was estimated at 15,000–18,000 and was assumed to be a dominantly Uzbek city due to the market language which was mostly Chagatai language (Uzbeki). However, documents show it was a city of different ethnicities and people such as Tajiks, Turkmens, Pashtuns and Baluch. In 1958, the population was estimated to be 30,000. By 1979 this had risen to 38,250, and by 1982 to 56,973. Since there was never an official population census, those previous data should not be taken seriously. In 2004, it was estimated that Maymana has a population of 75,900 but was not backed by any evidence. In 2015, the population was estimated to be 149,040 by UN supported observers. Maymana has 10 districts and a total land area of 3,461 hectares. The total number of dwellings in this city are 16,560.

History

The town is of ancient origin. It seems clear that Maymana citadel dates back to the early Iron Age. Ceramic materials in a nearby cave at Bilchiragh are from the Paleolithic and late Neolithic-Bronze Age. Between 800 B.C and 700 A.D it was part of Median and Persian Empire, as well of Kushanian and Hephtalite, before being subjugated by Arabs during the Islamic Conquest who used local Iranian vassals to rule the region. In the 7th and 8th century it was the residence of the Malik of Guzganan, last Kushanian remnants, which was then under the control of the Farighunid, a native dynasty. From the 9th to 11th century the region was ruled by several rulers and dynasties (Saffarid, Mihrabanid, Nasrid...) from Sistan and then being subjugated by the Iranian Samanid and the Irano-Turkic Ghaznavid and Khwarizm rulers. 

In the 12th and 13th century the region was devastated by nomadic Turks and invading Mongols. It took long for the region, nearly 200 years, to recover from the damage the nomadic and invading Turko-Mongol foreigners from northern Central Asia had caused. The area's population remained thin and the commercial trade was very weak but enough for the survivors to develop new agricultural and rebuild old structures. While the city was garrisoned and hosted Iranians and some Arabs, the villages as well owned by Iranians and settled remnants of Arabs, the deserts and steppe were home of wandering nomads of Turko-Mongolian and Iranian stocks (Aymaq). 
In the 16th century, the Turkic Uzbek influence came to Maymana with the invasions of Turkistan and Herat by Muhammad Shaibani. For the region it was again a complicated time. However, Shaibani was defeated by the Iranian Saffavids but the Uzbek elements remained dominant from then up to day in the region until in the 18th and 19th centuries.

During that time the city became the center of the Maimana Khanate and an important centre for commerce, as well as being the gateway to Turkistan from Herat and Iran. It served as an important cultural and trade centre for the whole region and served to connect various different states and peoples. Under the Uzbek rule, the city experienced a sudden renaissance, starting from the conquest of the area by Muhammad Shaibani and lasting all the way down to the Pashtun subjugation of the region. In 1876, under Sher Ali Khan, the city fell to the kingdom of Kabul and was viciosly put in ruins. As result, only ten percent of the population remained alive while a large part either died or left the city for other regions after the horrific slaughter.

In the 20th century, the city was once strongly walled with thick walls and towers and surrounded by a moat, but in the 20th century all this has been reduced to an anonymous mound. In 1934, the rebuilding of the city started, and in 1949 the northern parts of the old city were renewed, the old city citadel changed to a park. Maymana was the administrative center of Meymaneh Province until the disintegration of the province.

As part of the International Security Assistance Force operation in Afghanistan, a Provincial Reconstruction Team led by Norway formerly operated in the province. The team also included Latvian troops.

Transportation
Maymana is served by Maymana Airport which had direct flights to Herat as of May 2014.

Economy
The town serves an agricultural area irrigated from the Qeysar River and also handles the trade in Karakul sheep with nomads. Maymana is an important livestock centre in Afghanistan. In the 1970s, the wool and cotton processing industry was booming in the city. Maymana is a market for leather goods, silk, carpets, wheat, barley, melons and grapes.

There is also an airport  located 2 miles (3.2 km) west of Maymana  in a valley surrounded by hills and a range of mountains  with some peaks reaching 12,000 ft.; 24 miles (39 km) southeast of the Turkmenistan border; and 64 miles (103 km) south of Andkhoy. The runway is with gravel surface.
 
Maymana is, after Kabul, Kandahar, Herat, Mazar-i-Sharif, Jalalabad, Kunduz, and Ghazni, the eighth-largest Afghan town with an independent women-managed radio station, Radio Quyaash, established in February 2005.

Climate
Maymana has a hot-summer Mediterranean climate (Köppen climate classification: Csa) with hot, dry summers and cold, moist winters.

References

External links 
 Dupree, Nancy Hatch (1977): An Historical Guide to Afghanistan. 2nd Edition. Revised and Enlarged.  Afghan Tourist Organization. (First edition: 1970.)

Populated places in Faryab Province
Provincial capitals in Afghanistan
Cities in Afghanistan